Chigan (also Romanized as Chīgān; also known as Chegān and Jīgān) is a village in Varzaq-e Jonubi Rural District, in the Central District of Faridan County, Isfahan Province, Iran. At the 2006 census, its population was 422, in 120 families.

References 

Populated places in Faridan County